Dorothea Margaret Home Rawdon Briggs (5 April 1905 – 1990), was usually called by her maiden name, Molly Briggs or "Briggsy". She was a mountain climber, described as a "charismatic adventurer".

Family
Briggsy became Countess Gravina when she married the Count Gravina, by then a widower, in Buckingham on 16 May 1933, when she was 20.

After the marriage, they lived at Meran in the Italian Tyrol and she climbed and skied in the Alps with an uncle Binnie Briggs, who had been a founder member of the Alpine Ski Club, and with her husband, who was also a very competent skier.

Her mother-in-law, a predecessor as Countess Gravina, was the daughter of the celebrated conductor Hans von Bülow and his wife Cosima (later the mistress, then the wife, of the composer Richard Wagner).

Their son Christopher, now Count Gravina, was born in 1934 in Buckingham (Vol. 3a, p. 1793). There were two more sons of the marriage.

Her husband, Count Gravina
Her husband, Gilbert Graf Gravina was born 17.10.1890 in Palermo, Italy. His German mother Blandine, born von Bülow, had married the Italian count Biagio [=Blasius] Gravina in 1882. She was by her mother Cosima a granddaughter of Franz Liszt and stepdaughter of Richard Wagner. Gilbert went to school in Bayreuth and studied mechanics at Dresden and Leipzig. At the same time he practised his musical talents. During the First World War he served in the Italian army. After that war he returned to Germany and worked as an orchestra-conductor. He spent the Second World War at his house in Meran. Later he lived in Bayreuth and worked as a musical assistant for the Richard Wagner Festival. Graf Gravina was a very popular man in Bayreuth; he died there on 23 November 1972.

Career
At the outbreak of war, Briggsy, a Briton in enemy territory, made her way with her sons to England, where she lived in a caravan on a farm, and got a job delivering milk door-to-door to keep herself and her small sons. She never saw her husband again, but at the time of his death she was living in Frittenden, Cranbrook, Kent and with the youngest son she attended his funeral.

Briggsy became very much involved with the Girl Guide Movement.

Climbing
Briggsy started climbing when she was only 4 years old, on the roof of her home in Yorkshire. In the 1920s she travelled in South and East Africa, and was possibly the first woman to climb Kilimanjaro.

In 1959, aged 55, Briggsy took command of an expedition up 26,867-foot Mount Cho Oyu after its leader, Mme. Claude Kogan of France, another climber, Mlle. Claudine van der Straten-Ponthoz, and two Sherpa porters had perished in an avalanche at 23,000 feet. Their attempt to scale the sixth highest mountain in the world was the first time in history that an expedition composed entirely of women (excepting guides and porters) had ever challenged such a peak.

In about 1968, Briggsy went to South Africa and climbed there. She travelled on to Tanzania, and climbed Kilimanjaro. She then travelled on northwards, by third class railway through the Sudan, where the other passengers (all Muslim) required her to "cover up". She eventually reached Egypt, and much to her disappointment had to fly to Italy, where she hitch-hiked up the spine in a fish-lorry that picked her up at 6 in the morning. She eventually arrived at the home of her friend Olave Baden-Powell at Hampton Court Palace, where she stayed a few days before going home.

References

1905 births
1990 deaths
English mountain climbers
Female climbers